The Reflector is the student newspaper of Mississippi State University. The Reflector was established in 1884 as The Dialective Reflector, and its name was changed to The Reflector in 1889. During World War II, the newspaper was published under the name Maroon and White and operated only by the faculty between 1944 to 1945. The newspaper continues to remain today as the oldest college newspaper in the SEC (Southeastern Conference).

History 
The newspaper was first published as The Dialective Reflector between 1884 to 1889 before its name being shortened to The Reflector. It had subsequently published under its current name except for a brief period between 1944 to 1945 when it was operated by faculty and was named Maroon and White during World War II. Following the war, the newspaper resumed publication under its previous name The Reflector. It continues to this day as the oldest running college newspaper in the SEC.

In 2003, the office complex housing the student publications was renamed to Henry F. Meyer Student Media Center in the honor of former university newspaper advisor Henry F. Meyer.

Website 

The Reflector On-Line was created in December 1996. The original web URL was www.reflector.msstate.edu

The Reflector launched their non-edu website on February 02nd, 2001, swapping to the www.reflector-online.com domain.

While operating, the Reflector website has gathered various awards and honors from statewide, regional and national outlets. It received two national NBS Aehro awards (2020 and 2021) while managed by Brandon Grisham, the former Online editor. It received finalist recognition in 2022 while manged by Joshua Britt.

Grisham's archival work led to the creation of the Digital Issue Collection and the GAP (Grisham Archival Project, created with resources collected through the Mitchell Memorial Library). Both projects offered digital articles and e-editions of older published materials.

The current website offers access to images, online e-editions, news articles, and podcasts.

References

Student newspapers published in Mississippi
Mississippi State University